"Tears May Fall" is a song from the album Scars of Love, released as a single by the freestyle music group TKA in 1987. The song peaked at No. 6 on the Hot Dance Music/Club Play chart in the United States, becoming the second most successful single from the album.

Track listing
 12" Single

Charts

References

1987 singles
TKA songs
1987 songs
Song articles with missing songwriters